Henri Storck (5 September 1907 – 17 September 1999) was a Belgian writer, filmmaker and documentarist.

In 1933, he directed, with Joris Ivens, Misère au Borinage, a film about the miners in the Borinage area. In 1938, with Andre Thirifays and Pierre Vermeylen, he founded the Cinémathèque Royale de Belgique (Royal Belgian Film Archive).

Storck was an actor in two key films of the history of the cinema: Jean Vigo's Zéro de conduite (1933) in the role of the priest, and Chantal Akerman's Jeanne Dielman, 23 Quay Commercial, 1080 Brussels (1975) in the role of a customer of the prostitute.

Jacqueline Aubenas wrote about him, in her expository work, It's been going on for 100 years: a history of the francophone cinema of Belgium: "There emerges forcefully the personality of a cineaste who is not a militant in the sense that this term had in the 1930s for Soviet directors who held an ideology, but in the sense of a generous man who will never choose the wrong side and who will be, in ethics as well as in esthetics, in the first line of battle".

In 1959, he was a member of the jury at the 1st Moscow International Film Festival.

Awards and achievements 
 Doctor honoris causa of the Vrije Universiteit Brussel (1978) and the Université libre de Bruxelles (1995)
 cofounder with André Thirifays and Pierre Vermeylen, of the Cinémathèque de Belgique (1938)
 André Cavens Award for Best Film for Permeke (1985)
 honorary president of the Association belge des auteurs de films et de télévision (1992)
 founder member of the Association internationale des documentalistes (AID, 1963)
 lecturer at the Institut des arts de diffusion (IAD), Bruxelles (1966–1968)

Films
1927–1928
Films d'amateur sur Ostende

1929-1930
Pour vos beaux yeux - 8'
Images d'Ostende - 12'

1930
Une pêche au hareng - 15'
le Service de sauvetage à la côte belge - 18'
Ostende, reine des plages - 11'
Les Fêtes du Centenaire - 7'
Trains de plaisir - 8'
Films abstraits dessinés sur pellicule
La Mort de Vénus - 10'
Suzanne au bain - 10'

1931
Une idylle à la plage - 35'

1932
Les Travaux du tunnel sous l'Escaut - 20'
Histoire du soldat inconnu - 10'
Sur les bords de la caméra - 10' 1933
Trois vies et une corde - 33'

1933
Misère au Borinage - 28' (directed with Joris Ivens, sound since 1963)

1934
Création d'ulcères artificiels chez le chien - 15'
La Production sélective du réseau à 70 kVA - 20'

1935
Électrification de la ligne Bruxelles-Anvers - 20'
L'Ile de Pâques - 26'
Le Trois-mâts Mercator - 23'
Cap au Sud - 25'
L'Industrie de la tapisserie et du meuble sculpté - 13'
Le Coton - 13'

1936
Les Carillons - 13'
Les Jeux de l'été et de la mer - 14'
Sur les routes de l'été - 15'
Regards sur la Belgique ancienne - 20'

1937
La Belgique nouvelle - 26'
Un ennemi public - 27'
Les Maisons de la misère - 30'

1938
Comme une lettre à la poste - 25'
La Roue de la fortune - 15'
Terre de Flandre - 11'
Vacances - 11'
Le Patron est mort - 31'
Pour le droit et la liberté à Courtrai - 13'

1940
La Foire internationale de Bruxelles - unfinished

1942–1944
Symphonie paysanne : Le Printemps - 31'
Symphonie paysanne : l'Été - 23'
Symphonie paysanne : Noces paysannes - 19'
Symphonie paysanne : l'Automne - 20'
Symphonie paysanne : l'Hiver - 22'

1945
Rencontre d'artistes - 7'

1946
Le Monde de Paul Delvaux - 11'

1947
La Joie de revivre - 13'

1948
Rubens - 65' (directed with Paul Haesaerts)

1949
Au carrefour de la vie - 28'

1950
Carnavals - 15'

1951
Le Banquet des fraudeurs - 90'

1952
La Fenêtre ouverte - 18'

1953
Herman Teirlinck - 55'

1954
Les Belges et la mer - 15'
Les Portes de la nation - 15'

1953–1954
Le Tour du monde en bateau-stop - 20'

1955
Le Trésor d'Ostende - 24'
Dix reportages sur le Congo belge, l'Argentine et le Brésil

1956
Décembre, mois des enfants - 21'30"

1957
Couleur de feu - 45'

1960
Les Gestes du silence - 15'

1961
Les Dieux du feu - 12'
L'Énergie est à vous - 20' (directed with Philippe Arthuys)

1962
Variations sur le geste - 23'
Le Bonheur d'être aimé ou Félix Labisse - 14'
Les Malheurs de la guerre - 11'

1963
Plastiques

1964
Matières nouvelles - 17'
Enquête sociologique en Yougoslavie

1965
Le Musée vivant - 34'

1970–1971
Paul Delvaux, ou les femmes défendues - 18' Palme d'Or nominee for short film.
 Fêtes de Belgique : Le Carnaval d'Ostende - 12'30"
 Fêtes de Belgique : Le Mardi gras à Alost - 11'30"
 Fêtes de Belgique : Le Carnaval de Malmedy - 12'30"
 Fêtes de Belgique : Le Théâtre de rues à Malmedy - 11'30"
 Fêtes de Belgique : Les Gilles de Binche - 26'
 Fêtes de Belgique : La Plantation de Meyboom et le théâtre de Toone à Bruxelles - 14'30"
 Fêtes de Belgique : La Procession du Saint-Sang à Bruges, les pénitents de Furnes - 12'45"
 Fêtes de Belgique : Les Blancs Moussîs de Stavelot et la Ducasse de Mons - 13'30"
 Fêtes de Belgique : La Passion du Christ à Lessines et à Ligny
 Fêtes de Belgique : Les Fêtes d'Outremeuse à Liège - 14'30"
 Fêtes de Belgique : Les Chinels de Fosses
 Fêtes de Belgique : Les Grands-més de La Louvière
 Fêtes de Belgique : le Tir des Campes à Liège - 12'

1975
Fifres et tambours d'entre Sambre et Meuse - 21'
Les Marcheurs de Sainte Rolande - 17'
Les Joyeux tromblons - 16'

1978
Le Chant du peintre - 11'

1985
Permeke - 90' (directed with Patrick Conrad)

See also
 Les Enfants du Borinage - Lettre à Henri Storck

Notes

References 
 Geens Vincent, Bula Matari : un rêve d'Henri Storck; Cahiers Henri Storck n° 1, Crisnée, Yellow Now, 2000
 Emile Cantillon, Paul Davay, Josette Debacker, Jacques Polet, Daniel Sotiaux ...[et al.], Henri Storck, Bruxelles, Association des professeurs pour la promotion de l'éducation cinématographique
 Laura Vichi, trad. de l'italien par Hélène Bernier et Salvatore Manzone, Henri Storck : de l'avant-garde au documentaire social, Crisnée, Yellow Now, 2002
 Jean Queval, Henri Storck ou La traversée du cinéma, Bruxelles, Festival national du film belge, 1976
Hommage à Henri Storck : films 1928/1985 : catalogue analytique, Bruxelles, Commissariat général aux relations internationales de la Communauté française de Belgique, 1995
 Reportage de la RTBF du vendredi 4 août 2006
 Interview, par Fabienne Bradfer, de l'historienne Florence Gillet paru dans le journal Le Soir du 6 août 2006 Henri Storck a-t-il collaboré ? article de Fabienne Bradfer paru le 6 août 2006 dans le journal Le Soir
 Luc de Heusch, Biographie d'Henri Storck, Fonds Henri Storck
 Luc Deneulin & Johan Swinnen "Henri Storck Memoreren" VUB Press 2006 (en NL)

1907 births
1999 deaths
Belgian filmmakers
Belgian documentary filmmakers
People from Ostend